The WWC Television Championship is a tertiary championship that is currently defended in the World Wrestling Council. The title was initially created in 1986 and used until 2003, then from February 3, 2007 until July 11, 2008. The title was brought back again on March 31, 2018, unofficially replacing the WWC Junior Heavyweight Championship.

Title History

|-
| colspan="9" style="text-align:center; background:#cfc;"|NWS Television Championship
|-

|-
| colspan="9" style="text-align:center; background:#cfc;"|WWC Television Championship
|-

Combined reigns 

{| class="wikitable sortable" style="text-align: center"
|-
!Rank
!Wrestler
!No. ofreigns
!Combineddays
|-
!1
| TNT || 5 || 755
|-
!2
| Rex King || 3 || 590
|-
!3
| Sean Morley || 4 || 509
|-
!4
| Gran Armando || 2 || 497
|-
!5
| Carlos Colón || 4 || 403
|-
!6
| Glamour Boy Shane || 7 || 380
|-
!7
| Don Kernodle || 2 || 308
|-
!8
| Jason The Terrible || 3 || 288
|-
!9
| Steve Strong || 3 || 287
|-
!11
| Bellito || 3 || 275
|-
!12
| Dick Murdoch || 3 || 274
|-
!13
|Zcion RT1 || 2 || 256
|-
!14
| Invader I || 5 || 249
|-
!15 
| El Diamante || 2 || 242
|-
!16
|Hombre Bestia Angel || 1 || 226 
|-
!17
| Chris Grant || 2 || 181
|-
!18
| Noriega || 1 || 180
|-
!19
| Mighty Kodiak || 2 || 157
|-
!20
| Super Gladiador || 1 || 133
|-
!21
| Dick Slater || 2 || 129
|-
!22
| Rico Suave || 5 || 122
|-
!23
| Ricky Santana || 3 || 113
|-
!24
| Crazy Rudy || 1 || 112
|-
!25
| BJ || 2 || 111
|-
!26
| Ron Starr || 2 || 103
|-
!27
| Diabolico || 2 || 91
|-
!28
| Alex Pourteau || 2 || 83
|-
!29
| Sweet Brown Sugar || 1 || 77
|-
!30
| Ash Rubinsky || 2 || 74
|-
!31
| Fidel Sierra || 3 || 64
|-
!rowspan=4|32
| Action Jackson/TNT || 1 || 63
|-
| Christopher Daniels || 1 || 63
|-
| Kevin Quinn || 1 || 63
|-
| OT Fernandez || 1 || 63
|-
!rowspan=2|33
| Chris Joel || 1 || 62
|-
| Dutch Mantel || 1 || 62
|-
!34
| King Kong || 1 || 58
|-
!35
| Ray González || 2 || 57
|-
!36
| Super Black Ninja || 1 || 56
|-
!37
| Chicky Starr || 1 || 54
|-
!38
| Miguel Pérez Jr. || 2 || 48
|-
!39
| Tom Brandi || 1 || 47
|-
!40
| style="background:#ffe6bd;"| Mike Nice || 1† ||  
|-
!41
| Huracán Castillo Jr. || 2 || 44
|-
!42
| Chris Candido || 1 || 43
|-
!43
| Superstar Romeo || 1 || 42
|-
!44
| Mustafa Saed || 1 || 36
|-
!45
| Wilfredo Alejandro || 1 || 33
|-
!rowspan=2|46
| Grizzly Boone || 1 || 32
|-
| Leo Burke || 1 || 32
|-
!rowspan=2|47
| Bad Boy Bradley || 1 || 28
|-
| "Jungle" Jim Steele || 1 || 28
|-
!48
| Invader IV || 1 || 23
|-
!49
| Chicano || 1 || 21
|-
!50
| Vengador Boricua || 1 || 19
|-
!51
| Hammett || 1 || 14
|-
!52
| El Bronco I || 1 || 12
|-
!53
| Plugarcito || 1 || 8
|-
!rowspan=2|54
| Curtis Jackson || 1 || 1
|-
| Derrick Dukes || 1 || 1
|-
!55
| Barrabás, Jr. || 1 || <1
|-

References

External links
 Wrestlingdata.com
 cagematch.net

World Wrestling Council championships
Television wrestling championships